Dzithankov is a village in the Ani Municipality of the Shirak Province of Armenia.

Demographics

References

World Gazetteer: Armenia – World-Gazetteer.com

Populated places in Shirak Province